Raza Odiada is the second album by Brujeria. Brujeria's main concepts are Satanism, revolution, pro-immigration, narcotics and drug smuggling, and related themes.

Album information
Raza Odiada (which translates in English as "Hated Race") is a song critical of Pete Wilson and his opposition to illegal immigration and to racial preferences. The song features ex-Dead Kennedys vocalist Jello Biafra as the voice of Pete Wilson. "La Migra" is a song about illegal immigration and corruption. "Revolución" is a pro-Zapatista song. A music video was released for the song "La Ley De Plomo", which received rotation on MTV.

It features three tracks originally appearing on the 7" singles El Patrón ("El Patrón" and "Hermanos Menéndez"), and ¡Machetazos! ("Padre Nuestro") on Alternative Tentacles. The cover features a photograph of Subcomandante Marcos, then-spokesperson and one of the leaders of the Zapatista Army of National Liberation.

Reception
NME (10/28/95, p. 56) - 8 (out of 10) - "[a] nugget... Brujeria are a Chicano hardcore band who sing in Spanish. Short and brutal, the assault begins with a scathing attack on California governor Pete Wilson's Proposition 187 - which stopped Mexican and South American immigrants in the state from receiving welfare, medical care and education."

Track listing
"Raza Odiada (Pito Wilson)" – 3:30 ("Hated Race ["Dick" Wilson]")
"Colas de Rata"– 1:33 ("Rat Tails")
"Hechando Chingasos (Greñudos Locos II)" – 3:34 ("Throwing Punches [Crazy Headbangers II]")
"La Migra (Cruza la Frontera II)" – 1:43 ("La Migra [Border Crossing II]")
"Revolución" – 3:18 ("Revolution")
"Consejos Narcos" – 2:39 ("Drug Dealer Advice")
"Almas de Venta" – 2:12 ("Souls for Sale")
"La Ley del Plomo" – 2:45 ("The Law of Lead")
"Los Tengo Colgando (Chingo de Mecos II)" – 1:48 ("I Have Them Hanging [Load of Cum II]")
"Sesos Humanos (Sacrificio IV)" – 1:15 ("Human Brains [Sacrifice IV]")
"Primer Meco" – 1:15 ("First Cum")
"El Patrón" – 3:42 ("The Boss")
"Hermanos Menéndez" – 2:05 ("Menéndez Brothers")
"Padre Nuestro" – 2:07 ("Our Father")
"Ritmos Satánicos" – 6:51 ("Satanic Rhythms")

Personnel
 Juan Brujo - vocals
 Asesino - guitars, bass
 Güero Sin Fe - bass, guitars
 Fantasma - bass, vocals
 Hongo - bass, guitars, drums
 Greñudo - drums
 Pinche Peach - vocals
 JR. Hozicon  - direction

References

Brujeria (band) albums
1995 albums
Roadrunner Records albums